Niklas Almqvist (born 26 January 1977), better known by his stage name Nicholaus Arson, is the lead guitarist and backup vocalist of the Swedish garage rock band The Hives, of which his brother Howlin' Pelle is the lead singer.

Career

Arson and his brother Per (Howlin' Pelle, lead singer) formed the band in 1993, and, according to a biography about the band, attracted the attention of promoter/manager/songwriter Randy Fitzsimmons (possibly a fictional character), who propelled the band to fame.

It was revealed in NME that Randy Fitzsimmons is a registered pseudonym belonging to Arson. This has led many to believe that Randy Fitzsimmons is in fact a myth, and that it is Arson who writes the songs. Arson and the rest of the band deny this and insist on the existence of Randy Fitzsimmons as the band's songwriter.

Arson, as with the rest of The Hives, is known for his onstage antics. In particular, his beady eye stares, spitting, blowing on his finger tips, flicking his guitar picks into the crowd and wild animation in playing the guitar.

Musical equipment 
Nicholaus uses almost exclusively Fender Telecaster, Esquire or Telecaster Deluxe style guitars (though he is seen playing a Danelectro in the Hate to Say I Told You So video). He also plays "The Arsonette" a custom built guitar by Sundberg Guitars, with tone chambers and a Firebird style midsection to give it a short, dead tone with little to no sustain. His guitars often reflect the outfits of the band with different combos of black and white finishes and pickguards. Along with Vigilante Carlstroem and Dr. Matt Destruction, Arson uses white Hiwatt amplifiers.

Although he doesn't rely on effects, he uses an Electro-Harmonix Micro POG, a Boss AW-3 auto wah, a Boss DD-3 digital delay and a Prunes & Custard Harmonic Generator-Intermodulator for certain songs or sounds.

Discography

Barely Legal (1997)
Veni Vidi Vicious (2000)
Tyrannosaurus Hives (2004)
The Black and White Album (2007)
Lex Hives (2012)

References

External links 
 Official Hives website
 Sundberg Guitars

1977 births
A&M Records artists
Epitaph Records artists
Interscope Records artists
Living people
People from Västmanland
Swedish rock guitarists
Swedish songwriters
The Hives members